Roomic Cube (subtitled ...A Tiny Room Exhibition) is the second studio album by Japanese musician Takako Minekawa. It was released on May 25, 1996, by Polystar. The album was released in the United States on February 18, 1997, by March Records.

Recubed, an EP consisting of remixes of tracks from Roomic Cube, was released by March and Emperor Norton Records on July 7, 1998. The Roomic Cube track "Fantastic Cat" came to prominence in 2006 when it was featured in a Miller Brewing Company beer advertisement featuring a man on a bicycle descending down a hill.

Critical reception

In 2011, Roomic Cube was included in LA Weeklys "beginner's guide" to Shibuya-kei music.

Track listing

Personnel
Credits are adapted from the album's liner notes.

 Takako Minekawa – performance, arrangement
 Buffalo Daughter – performance, arrangement, production
 Kenichi Makimura – executive production
 Tadashi Matsuda – mixing, recording
 Takeo Ogiso – photography
 Megumi Shigetomi – mastering

References

External links
 

1996 albums
Takako Minekawa albums